Australian Magazine may refer to:

 The Australian Magazine; or, Compendium of Religious, Literary, and Miscellaneous Intelligence, the first Australian periodical
 See also The Australian